Bundoora Football Club is an Australian rules football club in Bundoora, Victoria, currently competing in the Northern Football League. They are affiliated with the Bundoora Junior Football Club, who play in the Yarra Junior Football League.

History
1975–1980 P.H.F.L A Grade Premiers 1980
1981–1981 D.V.F.L Division Two, Premiers 1981
1982–2006 D.V.F.L Division One, Premiers 1995, 1996
2007–2017 N.F.L    Division One, Premiers 2011, 2013, 2017
2018- present N.F.N.L Division One, Reserves Premiers 2018, 2019

VFL/AFL  players
Mark Slater (Collingwood)
Cameron Cloke (Collingwood, Carlton & Port Adelaide)
Gary Moorcroft (Essendon & Melbourne)
Ricky Dyson,  (Essendon)

Brad Boyd (Fitzroy & Brisbane Lions)

Paul Walker (Collingwood )

League Best & Fairest Winners

League Leading Goalkickers
2016 Gary Moorcroft 73 NFL
2014 Gary Moorcroft 68 NFL
2013 Cameron Cloke 93 NFL
2012 Gary Moorcroft 75 NFL
1980 Ron Huy  129 P.H.F.L.

References

External links

 Bundoora Football Netball Club Website
 NFL Website

Northern Football League (Australia) clubs
1974 establishments in Australia
Australian rules football clubs established in 1974
Sport in the City of Banyule
Australian rules football clubs in Melbourne